Stephen Valiquette (born August 20, 1977) is a Canadian former professional ice hockey goaltender. Valiquette played 46 games in the National Hockey League, nearly all for the New York Rangers, before finishing his playing career in Europe.

Valiquette is currently employed as a studio analyst for MSG Network covering the Rangers.

Professional career
While playing junior hockey for the Sudbury Wolves of the Ontario Hockey League (OHL), Valiquette was drafted by the Los Angeles Kings of the National Hockey League (NHL) in the 1996 NHL Entry Draft in the eighth round. Playing two more seasons in the OHL with the Wolves and the Erie Otters, Valiquette never actually played for the Kings organization, and in 1998, now a free agent, signed with the New York Islanders.  Valiquette played in six NHL games for the Islanders  in 1999-2000, but otherwise played for a variety of teams in the East Coast Hockey League (ECHL) and American Hockey League (AHL) through 2003. When Valiquette made his playing debut in 2000, he was the tallest goaltender to ever play a game in the NHL at 6-foot-6. Ben Bishop, standing 6-foot-7, has since surpassed Valiquette as the tallest NHL goaltender.

In July 2003, Valiquette signed as a free agent with the Edmonton Oilers. Three months later, he was claimed on waivers by the Florida Panthers in the NHL waiver draft on October 3, 2003. Six days later he was claimed back by the Edmonton Oilers. He appeared in one game with Edmonton, playing 14 minutes. Valiquette spent the balance of the 2003–04 season with the Toronto Roadrunners of the AHL, playing in 35 games.

On March 3, 2004, Valiquette was traded by the Oilers, along with forward Dwight Helminen and a second-round selection in the 2004 draft to the New York Rangers for center Petr Nedvěd and goaltender Jussi Markkanen. Valiquette spent the 2004–05 season with the Rangers' AHL affiliate, the Hartford Wolf Pack, during the NHL lockout. That season, he and teammate Jason LaBarbera shared the Harry "Hap" Holmes Memorial Award, awarded to the goalie (or goalies) with the league's lowest team goals against average. In fact, Valiquette owned the league's lowest goals against average with 1.77. He then signed with Lokomotiv Yaroslavl of the Russian Superleague on April 26, 2005.

In July 2006, the Rangers brought Valiquette back, and re-signed him. On March 3, 2007, he won his first game in the NHL in almost three years. With the departure of starting goalie Kevin Weekes to the New Jersey Devils, in July 2007, Valiquette became the back-up to Henrik Lundqvist. On January 31, 2008, against the Philadelphia Flyers, Valiquette recorded the first shutout of his NHL career, as the Rangers won 4-0. Ten days later, on February 9, he recorded his second consecutive shutout in a 2–0 win, also against the Flyers. He went on to finish the season 5-5-2. The following year, in a February 6, 2009 game against the Dallas Stars, he let 10 goals in a single game, a league worst for the season.

Valiquette appeared in his first career NHL playoff games with the Rangers during the first round of the 2009 Stanley Cup Playoffs against the Washington Capitals when he relieved starting goalie Henrik Lundqvist for the third period of games five and six, playing 40 minutes and allowing no goals on nine shots. Over the span of five seasons with the Rangers, Valiquette recorded 14 wins, 4 of them as shutouts. Shortly after what proved to be his final NHL game, an 8-3 loss to the Pittsburgh Penguins, in which he gave up all 8 goals, Valiquette was put on waivers, and subsequently sent to the Hartford Wolf Pack, in an effort to restore his game. He did not play for the Rangers again, and on July 15 Valiquette signed with the KHL side HC CSKA Moscow, who bought out his contract after one season.

During the summer of 2011, Valiquette turned down an offer to return to Lokomotiv Yaroslavl, due to a lack of guaranteed playing time. This proved fortunate for him, in light of the 2011 Lokomotiv Yaroslavl plane crash, which killed nearly the entire team and staff. Unsigned and not playing, it was announced in November 2011 that Valiquette, who runs a goalie school of his own, was taking a position at Quinnipiac University as the volunteer goalie coach for the men's NCAA team. However, a couple of days later, the AHL's Bridgeport Sound Tigers, for whom Valiquette had played while in the Islanders' system, put out a call for an emergency backup, as they were shorthanded due to injuries with their Islanders parent club. Ultimately, Valiquette wound up not having to play for the Sound Tigers, and moved on to play for HC Valpellice of the Italian Serie A league, which in 14 games, he led in save percentage and goals against average.   
After his season at HC Valpellice, Valiquette signed with Swedish club Djurgården of the HockeyAllsvenskan league, but instead retired due to injury.

Career statistics

Regular season and playoffs

References

External links
Steve Valiquette Official Website

1977 births
Living people
Bridgeport Sound Tigers players
Canadian ice hockey goaltenders
Dayton Bombers players
Edmonton Oilers players
Erie Otters players
Franco-Ontarian people
Hampton Roads Admirals players
Hartford Wolf Pack players
Lokomotiv Yaroslavl players
Los Angeles Kings draft picks
Lowell Lock Monsters players
New York Islanders players
New York Rangers players
Providence Bruins players
Sportspeople from Etobicoke
Ice hockey people from Toronto
Springfield Falcons players
Sudbury Wolves players
Toronto Roadrunners players
Trenton Titans players
Canadian expatriate ice hockey players in Russia